Wheelchair fencing at the 1996 Summer Paralympics consisted of 15 events, 9 for men and 6 for women.

Medal table

Participating nations

Medal summary

Men's events

Women's events

See also 
Fencing at the 1996 Summer Olympics

References 

 

1996 Summer Paralympics events
1996
Paralympics
International fencing competitions hosted by the United States